The Canon EF 180/3.5L Macro USM lens is the longest macro lens made by Canon in the EF mount and is one of only two Canon macro lenses that are part of the L series. This lens is compatible with the Canon Extender EF teleconverters.

References

External links 

 
 digital-picture.com
 Fred Miranda review
 photo.net

Canon EF 180mm f/3.5L Macro USM lens
Canon EF lenses
Canon L-Series lenses